In the Estonian mythology and Kreutzwald's epic Kalevipoeg, Linda was the mother of Kalevipoeg and the wife of Kalev.

She has given the name to several Estonian locations, including the Lindakivi (Linda boulder) in Lake Ülemiste. According to the epic myth "Kalevipoeg", her son, the title character, named the Estonian fortress settlement at the location of modern Tallinn in her honor - Lindanise (approximate translation: Linda's nipple or bosom).

See also
 Legends of Tallinn

References

Estonian mythology
Kalevipoeg
Characters in epic poems